Whitten Peak is a pyramidal peak, 445 m, forming the northeast end of Blade Ridge at the west side of the head of Hope Bay, on the northeast end of Antarctic Peninsula. Discovered by the Swedish Antarctic Expedition, 1901–04, under Nordenskjold. Named by the Falkland Islands Dependencies Survey (FIDS) for R. Whitten, first mate of the ship Eagle, which participated in FIDS operations in 1944–45.

Mountains of Trinity Peninsula